Leninogorsk is a town in the Republic of Tatarstan, Russia, located  southeast of Kazan. Population:

Administrative and municipal status
Within the framework of administrative divisions, Leninogorsk serves as the administrative center of Leninogorsky District, even though it is not a part of it. As an administrative division, it is incorporated separately as the town of republic significance of Leninogorsk—an administrative unit with the status equal to that of the districts. As a municipal division, the town of republic significance of Leninogorsk is incorporated within Leninogorsky Municipal District as Leninogorsk Urban Settlement.

Economy
Leninogorsk is important to the Russia's oil industry. The Romashkino Field located here in the Volga-Ural oil and gas region, also called the "Second Baku," is operated by Tatneft.

References

Sources



Cities and towns in Tatarstan
Bugulminsky Uyezd
Renamed localities in Russia